The cabinet led by Hossein Ala' was formed on 20 March 1951 two weeks after the assassination of Prime Minister Haj Ali Razmara. The cabinet was given vote of confidence at the Majlis on 17 April 1951. However, the tenure of the cabinet was very short and lasted only until 27 April when Hossein Ala' resigned from office due to threats of the Fada'iyan-e Islam members who had murdered Haj Ali Razmara. Another reason for the resignation of the cabinet was the ratification of the oil nationalization bill. It was succeeded by the cabinet formed by Mohammad Mosaddegh in late April.

Cabinet members
The cabinet consisted of the following members:

References

External links

1951 establishments in Iran
1951 disestablishments in Iran
Cabinets of Iran
Cabinets established in 1951
Cabinets disestablished in 1951